LifeVest® refers to:

 a brand of wearable cardioverter defibrillator developed by LifeCor (company acquired by ZOLL Medical)

Life vest refers to a:

 personal flotation device

Life Vest Inside,
 Global Kindness Organization